Stollings may refer to:

Stollings, West Virginia
Stollings (surname)